Andrij Parekh (born September 20, 1971) is an American cinematographer and television director.

Early life
Parekh was born in Cambridge, Massachusetts of Ukrainian and Indian descent. Parekh went to high school in Minnesota at The Blake School and attended Carleton College, where he graduated in 1995 with a degree in sociology/anthropology and a minor in media studies. He went on to study cinematography at NYU's Tisch School of the Arts (MFA, 2001) and the FAMU film school in Prague. While at NYU, he was nominated for the 1998 Eastman Excellence in Cinematography award. In 2001, he won an honorable mention from the American Society of Cinematographers in the "Heritage Award" category.

Career
He currently lives and works in New York City, shooting features and music videos, including work for artists such as MGMT (Electric Feel) or The Killers (Spaceman). In 2004 he was named one of Filmmaker Magazine's "25 New Faces of Indie Film"and was included as one of Variety's "Ten Cinematographers to Watch." Recently, he was invited to join the American Society of Cinematographers.

On September 20, 2020, at the 72nd Primetime Emmy Awards, he was announced as the winner of that year's Emmy for Outstanding Directing for a Drama Series for his work directing “Hunting”, an episode of that year's Outstanding Drama Series winner, Succession. More recently, he signed a deal with HBO.

Filmography

Television

References

External links

www.andrijparekh.com Official Website

1971 births
American cinematographers
American people of Gujarati descent
American people of Ukrainian descent
Living people
Tisch School of the Arts alumni
Carleton College alumni